Headlines is an album by the R&B group Midnight Star, released in 1986. It was the last album to include the Calloway brothers, who left to form Calloway.

The album peaked at No. 42 on the UK Albums Chart.

Critical reception
The Los Angeles Times wrote that "there isn't enough heavyweight material here ... These kind of 'Headlines' only rate a cursory scan." The Ottawa Citizen thought that "the sultry voice of Belinda Lipscomb on two slow dancers, 'Searching for Love' and 'Stay Here by My Side', make Headlines a complete and solid effort from Midnight Star."

Track listing
"Headlines" – 7:49 (Belinda Lipscomb, Bill Simmons, Bobby Lovelace, Melvin Gentry, Reggie Calloway, Vincent Calloway)
"Midas Touch" – 5:00 (Bo Watson, June Watson-Williams)
"Stay Here by My Side" – 4:40 (Simmons)
"Close to Midnight" – 4:33 (Watson, M. Gentry, Karen Gentry)
"Get Dressed" – 4:58 (Lipscomb, Watson, Watson-Williams, M. Gentry)
"Engine No. 9" – 5:23 (Lovelace, K. Gentry, M. Gentry)
"Close Encounter" – 4:20 (Lipscomb, Simmons, R. Calloway, V. Calloway)
"Dead End" – 4:24 (Lipscomb, Watson, R. Calloway, V. Calloway)
"Searching for Love" – 5:01 (Lipscomb, Watson)

Personnel

Midnight Star
Belinda Lipscomb: Vocals
Bo Watson: Vocals, keyboards, synth programming
Melvin Gentry: Lead guitar, percussion, backing vocals
Jeff Cooper: Rhythm guitar, synth programming
Kenneth Gant: Bass guitar, vocals
Bill Simmons: Saxophone, keyboards, synth programming
Reggie Calloway: Keyboards, trumpet, flute, vocals
Vincent Calloway: Keyboards, trumpet, trombone, vocoder
Bobby Lovelace: Drums, drum programming, percussion

Additional personnel
Marcus Miller: Bass on track 6

Charts

Weekly charts

Year-end charts

Singles

Certifications

References

External links
 Midnight Star-Headlines at Discogs

 

1986 albums
Midnight Star albums
SOLAR Records albums
Elektra Records albums